The Middle Village–Metropolitan Avenue station is a terminal station of the BMT Myrtle Avenue Line of the New York City Subway. It is located at the intersection of Metropolitan Avenue and Rentar Plaza in Middle Village, Queens. The station is served by the M train at all times.

History

The station originally opened on October 1, 1906, to serve the adjacent Lutheran cemetery. It was part of an extension of the line past Wyckoff Avenue along a former steam dummy surface line. A second station opened on August 9, 1915, west of the original facility, while the other former surface stations were elevated. On July 16, 1974, a fire completely destroyed the original wooden platform and station house along with R27 cars 8202, 8203, 8237 and R30 car 8512 along with some fire damage done to R32 cars 3549, 3659, 3694 and 3695, and the station had to be completely rebuilt. It reopened in 1980 with the current concrete platform and brick stationhouse.

By railroad and service directions, the station is the southern terminal of both the Myrtle Avenue Line and full-length M train. It was the northern terminal of the M train by service direction before its reroute on June 27, 2010. Even though this is the M southern terminal by railroad direction, the service's late-night terminus, Myrtle Avenue, is geographically further south, but the weekend and weekday terminals at Essex Street and Forest Hills–71st Avenue, respectively, are geographically further north.

Station layout

The station, built on an embankment with the north end at street level, has two tracks and a concrete island platform with benches. The tracks end at bumper blocks at the north end of the platform. A steel canopy with fluorescent lights and supported by silver columns covers the entire platform.

On the side of the westernmost track opposite from the platform is an employee-only facility. The control tower for the Myrtle Avenue Line is at the south end of the platform. Just to the south of the station lies the Fresh Pond Yard. It is only accessible from this station, so trains coming from Manhattan and Brooklyn must first enter the station, then reverse into the yard.

Exit

The grade-level station house, the station's only entrance, is located at the eastern corner of Rentar Plaza and Metropolitan Avenue. It is made of bricks with glass windows. There are two pairs of doors leading to the platform, turnstile bank and token booth. Also, there are two pairs of doors out to the street corner and another door along Metropolitan Avenue. Because the station house is at ground level and the platform extends out of the station house, this station is fully ADA-accessible, but does not have an elevator or ramp due to it being at ground level.

Points of interest
The New York Connecting Railroad travels in an open-cut, directly east of and parallel to the station. To the station's east is Christ the King Regional High School. Directly to the west of the station is Metro Mall, a large shopping mall opened in the early 1970s with now relatively few stores. The station is located at Metropolitan Avenue's intersection with Rentar Plaza, which is the access road to the mall's parking lots. The Lutheran All Faiths Cemetery is located on the northern and eastern sides of the station.

References

External links 

 
 Station Reporter — M train
 The Subway Nut — Middle Village–Metropolitan Avenue Pictures
 Metropolitan Avenue entrance from Google Maps Street View
 Platform from Google Maps Street View

BMT Myrtle Avenue Line stations
New York City Subway stations in Queens, New York
New York City Subway terminals
Railway stations in the United States opened in 1915
1915 establishments in New York City
Middle Village, Queens